Tel Aviv HaHagana railway station is a major railway station on the Ayalon Railway in southern Tel Aviv, Israel, serving most lines of Israel Railways. It is located in the median of the Ayalon Highway, north of Highway 1 and 400 meters east of the Tel Aviv Central Bus Station. In 2019, over six million passengers used the station, making it the third-busiest in the country after the nearby Savidor Central and HaShalom stations.

The station building fronts a road bridge above the highway, connecting Lewinsky Street with HaHagana Road. The station's proximity to the central bus station makes it an important interchange.

History
The station was constructed in stages. It was originally built with a single island platform and two tracks. The station building was constructed above the platform, but only half of its original design was built. Later another island platform was added to the east and the station building was expanded. Finally, another side platform was built, which serves the line to Ashdod. Those tracks cross above the older Jaffa–Jerusalem railway south of the station.

Electrification works in the station were completed in 2019. A sixth platform is expected to be added to the station in the mid-2020s as part of the project to add a fourth track to the Ayalon Railway.

Access
Dan Bus Company lines 16, 46, 54, 104, 204 and 304 stop at the station's entrance and on the other side of the HaHagana road bridge. A pedestrian pass under the bridge connects the station with the latter stop. These lines mostly serve southern Tel Aviv, with lines 104 and 204 offering a frequent and fast service to Allenby Street,  beach promenades and Ben Yehuda Street. A number of lines stop at HeHarash Street, stretching immediately to the west of the station, parallel to Ayalon Highway. These include Dan line 31, Egged line 26 to Bat Yam, Egged lines 71, 171 and 271 to Holon, Egged line 274 to Rehovot and a few other lines with part-time service run by Egged and Kavim. The access to the Central Bus Station is via Lewinsky Street.

Train service

Station layout
Platform numbers increase in a West-to-East direction

Ridership

References

Railway stations in Tel Aviv
Railway stations opened in 2002
2002 establishments in Israel